Wicklow Farmhouse Cheese is a range of handmade cow's milk cheese made in Arklow, County Wicklow ranging from Brie cheeses to Cheddar cheese. A range of cheese are produced varying from fresh soft cheese to a Gouda style hard cheese.

History 
Wicklow Farmhouse Cheese was set up in 2005 by John Hempenstall as a way of supplementing farm income. The cheese is made exclusively from the milk of the Hempenstall's Friesian cows and each cheese is handmade on the farm.

Products
Wicklow Farmhouse Cheese produce a number of cow's milk cheeses:
 Wicklow Blue is a blue veined brie cheese using pasteurised cows milk and vegetarian rennet.
 Wicklow Bán is a brie cheese
 Wicklow Gold is a cheddar cheese made using pasteurised cows milk. Several flavoured varieties are also produced such as "Nettle and Chive" and "Basil and Garlic".
 St. Kevins Brie is produced for the catering industry

Awards
Wicklow Farmhouse Cheese has won numerous awards. 
 2013 Global Cheese Awards awarded medals in different categories including a Gold medal for Wicklow Bán, a Silver medal for Wicklow Blue and a Bronze medal for Wicklow Blue.
 2014 Nantwich Cheese Show awarded the trophy for best vegetarian cheese to Wicklow Blue

References

Irish cheeses
Food and drink in Ireland